Steamboat Lake is a lake in Cass and Hubbard counties, in the U.S. state of Minnesota.  Steamboat Lake and adjacent Steamboat River were so named from the frequent steamboat traffic once traveling their waters.

See also
List of lakes in Minnesota

References

Lakes of Minnesota
Lakes of Cass County, Minnesota
Lakes of Hubbard County, Minnesota